The 2004–05 Polish Cup was the fifty-first season of the annual Polish cup competition. It began on 24 July 2004 with the Preliminary Round and ended on 21 June 2005 with second leg of the Final, played at Stadion Zagłębia Lubin, Lubin. The winners qualified for the second qualifying round of the UEFA Cup. Lech Poznań were the defending champions.

Preliminary round 
The matches took place on 24 July 2004.

! colspan="3" style="background:cornsilk;"|24 July 2004

|}

Notes
Note 1: Pogoń Staszów withdrew from the competition.

Round 1 
The matches took place on 3 and 4 August 2004.

! colspan="3" style="background:cornsilk;"|3 August 2004

|-
! colspan="3" style="background:cornsilk;"|4 August 2004

|}

Round 2 
The matches took place between 21 September and 5 December 2004.

Group 1

Group 2

Group 3

Group 4

Group 5

Group 6

Group 7

Group 8

Round 3 
The first legs took place between 5 and 24 March, when the second legs took place between 22 March and 13 April 2005.

|}

Quarter-finals 
The first legs took place on 10 and 11 May, when the second legs took place on 17 and 18 May 2005.

|}

Semi-finals 
The first legs took place on 8 June, when the second legs took place on 15 June 2005.

|}

Final

First leg

Second leg 

Dyskobolia Grodzisk Wlkp. won 2–1 on aggregate, but on 2 September 2020, they were deprived of this title in connection with proven cases of corruption and the trophy was not awarded to any team.

References

External links 
 90minut.pl 

Polish Cup seasons
Polish Cup
Cup